The 2015 South American Roller Hockey Clubs Championship was to be the 30th edition of the Roller Hockey South American Club Championship. It was held in December 2015 in Club Ciudad, Buenos Aires, in Argentina.

Final standings

References

External links

South American Roller Hockey Clubs Championship
International roller hockey competitions hosted by Argentina
Roller hockey in South America
 Sports competitions in Buenos Aires
2015 in Argentine sport